Ken Kennedy (August 12, 1945 – February 7, 2007) was an American computer scientist and professor at Rice University. He was the founding chairman of Rice's Computer Science Department.

Kennedy directed the construction of several substantial software systems for programming parallel computers, including an automatic vectorizer for Fortran 77, an integrated scientific programming environment, compilers for Fortran 90 and High Performance Fortran, and a compilation system for domain languages based on the numerical computing environment MATLAB.

He wrote over 200 articles and book chapters, plus numerous conference addresses. Kennedy was elected to the National Academy of Engineering in 1990. He was named a Fellow of the AAAS in 1994 and of the ACM and IEEE in 1995. In recognition of his achievements in compilation for high performance computer systems, he was honored as the recipient of the 1995 W. W. McDowell Award, the highest research award of the IEEE Computer Society. From 1997 to 1999, he served as co-chair of the President's Information Technology Advisory Committee (PITAC). In 1999, he was named recipient of the ACM SIGPLAN Programming Languages Achievement Award, the third time this award was given. In 2005, he was elected to the American Academy of Arts and Sciences.

Kennedy died of pancreatic cancer in Houston at the age of 61. At the time of his death he was the John and Ann Doerr University Professor in the department of Computer Science at Rice and the Director of the Center for High Performance Software Research (HiPerSoft).  As of November 20, 2006, he had directed the PhD dissertations of 38 graduate students and masters theses for 8 students.

Kennedy's last publication was The rise and fall of High Performance Fortran: an historical object lesson, in which Kennedy discussed the general failure of the High Performance Fortran language which he had championed.

On November 18, 2009, the ACM and 
IEEE
awarded the first Ken Kennedy CS Award
to Francine Berman of Rensselaer Polytechnic Institute.
The award was given at the ACM IEEE Supercomputing (or, "SC") '09 conference.

Bibliography 
Allen, Randy; Kennedy, Ken (2002). Optimizing Compilers for Modern Architectures: A Dependence-based Approach.  San Francisco: Morgan Kaufmann Publishers. .

References

External links
Ken Kennedy's homepage – at Rice University's Computer Science Department

List of McDowell Award recipients

1945 births
2007 deaths
American computer scientists
Fellows of the Association for Computing Machinery
Fellow Members of the IEEE
New York University alumni
Deaths from pancreatic cancer
Deaths from cancer in Texas
Members of the United States National Academy of Engineering
Rice University faculty
Rice University alumni
Researchers in distributed computing